If You Have an Aunt (German:Wenn Du eine Tante hast) is a 1925 German silent film directed by Carl Boese and starring Maly Delschaft, Wilhelm Diegelmann and Robert Garrison.
 
The film's sets were designed by the art director Julius von Borsody.

Cast
In alphabetical order
 Maly Delschaft as Trude  
 Wilhelm Diegelmann as Franziskus Knoll  
 Robert Garrison 
 Bruno Kastner as Schauspieler  
 Margarete Kupfer as Tante  
 Helga Molander as Hildegard  
 Hermann Picha as Rentier Kaltenbach  
 Eugen Rex as Hermann

References

Bibliography
 Grange, William. Cultural Chronicle of the Weimar Republic. Scarecrow Press, 2008.

External links

1925 films
Films of the Weimar Republic
Films directed by Carl Boese
German silent feature films
German black-and-white films
UFA GmbH films